William W. Clark (born 1940) is a professor of art history in the medieval studies program at the Graduate Center at Queens College, City University of New York. He is a widely published expert on early medieval, Romanesque, and Gothic art and architecture.

Clark earned his PhD in medieval art and architecture from Columbia University in 1970. He has taught at Queens College since the 1970s. Clark has written four books on medieval architecture. His scholarly papers have been published in major art and architecture history journals for five decades. He is a frequent speaker and chairperson at conferences such as those of the College Art Association, the International Congress on Medieval Studies, the International Medieval Congress, the Medieval Academy of America, and the American Society for Eighteenth-Century Studies.

Clark appeared in the PBS series "The Art of the Western World" as an expert on Gothic architecture and art, and in the Nova series "The Master Builders" with Princeton professor Robert Mark. He is a visiting faculty member at Southern Methodist University, for its program "Majesty, Memory, and Mourning in the Late Middle Ages."

Clark has received several grants to further his research. In 1978 Clark was awarded a grant from the American Council of Learned Societies to support his post-doctoral research. He received grants from the National Endowment for the Humanities in 1995 and 2000 for his research on medieval architecture.

Selected works
1979. "Spatial Innovations in the Chevet of Saint-Germain-des-Prés." Journal of the Society of Architectural Historians, Vol. 38, No. 4, p. 348–365
1983. The Architecture of Laon Cathedral. Harvey Miller Publishers. 
1984 with Robert Mark. "The First Flying Buttresses: A New Reconstruction of the Nave of Notre-Dame de Paris." Art Bulletin, Vol. 66, No. 1, p. 47–65
1984 with Robert Mark. "Gothic Structural Experimentation." Scientific American, Vol. 251, No. 5, p. 176–185
1985. "The Wandering Jew: Some Medieval and Renaissance Depictions," in A Tribute to Lotte Brand Philip, ed. by William W. Clark et al. New York: Abaris Press, p. 217-227
1987. "Suger's Church at Saint-Denis: The State of Research" in Abbot Suger and Saint-Denis: A Symposium, p. 105-130
1994 with Charles M. Radding. Medieval Architecture, Medieval Learning: Builders and Masters in the Age of Romanesque and Gothic. New Haven, Connecticut: Yale University Press. 
2000. "Reading Reims, I. The Sculptures on the Chapel Buttresses." Gesta, Vol. 39, No. 2, p. 135-145
2006. Medieval Cathedrals. Westport, Connecticut: Greenwood Press. 
2011 with Robert Bork and Abby McGehee. New Approaches to Medieval Architecture. Ashgate Press.

References

General sources
"Graduate Studies and Research." Queens College. Retrieved on September 30, 2013.
"Art History Faculty." Queens College. Retrieved on October 1, 2013.

Living people
Queens College, City University of New York faculty
American art historians
Columbia Graduate School of Architecture, Planning and Preservation alumni
1940 births
Southern Methodist University faculty
American medievalists